Maple is an unincorporated community in Crawford Township, Currituck County, North Carolina, United States, located at the intersection of NC Highway 168 and SR 1246 (Maple Road). Maple is located at latitude 36.4148780 North, and longitude -76.0040925 West. The elevation is three feet. Maple appears on the Currituck U.S. Geological Survey Map.

The United States Postal Service operates a post office located at 3452 Caratoke Hwy., Maple, NC.  The zip code for Maple is 27956.

The community of Maple is bounded on the east by Coinjock Bay, a tributary of Currituck Sound; on the west by the Great Swamp; on the south by the unincorporated community of Barco and on the north by the unincorporated community of Currituck.

Government and education facilities
Maple is home to the following local governmental and education facilities:

 College of The Albemarle Regional Aviation Technical Training Center 
 Currituck County Detention Facility, 413A Maple Rd., Maple, NC 27956 
 Currituck County Regional Airport, Airport Rd., Maple, NC 27956 
 Currituck County Sheriff's Office, 413A Maple Rd., Maple, NC 27956 
 Currituck County Water Plant, 442 Maple Rd., Maple, NC 27956 
 NC DOT Maintenance Yard, 397 Maple Rd., Maple, NC 27956

Nearby cities and towns
 Currituck 3.2 mi east-northeast
 Barco 3.6 mi southeast 
 Shawboro 3.6 mi southwest 
 Coinjock 5.8  southeast 
 Moyock 7.9 mi northwest 
 Knotts Island 7.9 mi northeast 
 Camden 9 mi southwest 
 Aydlett 10.4 mi southeast 
 Corolla 10.5 mi east
 Shiloh 12.8 mi south

Regional cities and towns
 Norfolk, Va 38.9 mi north-northwest 
 Elizabeth City 17.7 mi west-southwest
 Raleigh 183 mi west-southwest
 Greenville 116 mi southwest 
 Kitty Hawk 34.8 mi southeast

References

Unincorporated communities in Currituck County, North Carolina
Unincorporated communities in North Carolina
Populated places established in 1905
1905 establishments in North Carolina
Populated coastal places in North Carolina